Vrå railway station is a railway station serving the railway town of Vrå in Vendsyssel, Denmark.

The station is located on the Vendsyssel Line from Aalborg to Frederikshavn, between Hjørring station and Brønderslev station. It opened in 1871. The train services are currently operated by the railway company Nordjyske Jernbaner which runs frequent regional train services to Aalborg and Frederikshavn.

History 

The station opened in 1871 as the branch from Nørresundby to Frederikshavn of the new Vendsyssel Line opened on 16 August 1871. On 7 January 1879, at the opening of the Limfjord Railway Bridge, the Vendsyssel line was connected with Aalborg station, the Randers-Aalborg railway line and the rest of the Danish rail network.

Today, the station is closed but continues as a halt.

In 2017, the regional rail services on the Vendsyssel Line were transferred from the national railway company DSB to the regional railway company Nordjyske Jernbaner.

Architecture 
The station building is designed by the Danish architect Niels Peder Christian Holsøe, head architect of the Danish State Railways.

Operations 

The train services are operated by the railway company Nordjyske Jernbaner which runs frequent regional train services to Aalborg and Frederikshavn.

References

Notes

Bibliography

External links

 Banedanmark – government agency responsible for maintenance and traffic control of most of the Danish railway network
 Nordjyske Jernbaner – Danish railway company operating in North Jutland Region
 Danske Jernbaner – website with information on railway history in Denmark
 Nordjyllands Jernbaner – website with information on railway history in North Jutland

Railway stations in the North Jutland Region
Railway stations opened in 1871
Niels Peder Christian Holsøe railway stations
Railway stations in Denmark opened in the 19th century